Joseph Russell Hudelson (October 8, 1871 – December 16, 1944), sometimes referred to as J. R. Hudelson or J. R. Huddelson, was an American football player and coach. He served as the co-head football coach with Gustave Ferbert at Indiana University—now known as Indiana University Bloomington—for one season in 1894,compiling a record of 0–4–1. A native of Owensville, Indiana, Hudelson attended Purdue University, where he played halfback and quarterback from 1892 to 1893. He also played for Northwestern University in 1895 and at end for the 1895 Chicago Athletic Association football team.

Hudelson died on December 16, 1944, at his home in Chicago.

Head coaching record

References

1871 births
1944 deaths
19th-century players of American football
American football ends
American football halfbacks
American football quarterbacks
Indiana Hoosiers football coaches
Northwestern Wildcats football players
Purdue Boilermakers football players
People from Gibson County, Indiana
Coaches of American football from Indiana
Players of American football from Indiana